David Anthony Lowe (born 30 August 1965) is an English football coach and former footballer who is assistant head coach of Blackburn Rovers

As a player he was a right winger, he made 563 league appearances scoring 133 goals, in a career spanning 17 years. He played in the top five levels of English football. He notably played in the Premier League with Leicester City as well as in the Football League for Wigan Athletic, Ipswich Town, Port Vale, Wrexham and Rushden & Diamonds. He was capped twice by the England under-21s.

Following retirement he then turned his hand to coaching, he initially worked for the Professional Footballers' Association before re-joining Wigan as a coach under Paul Jewell. He later spent time with Derby County and took charge of the first team for one game in January 2009. He has since worked for both Manchester United and Tranmere Rovers.

Playing career

Wigan Athletic
Lowe began his career as an apprentice at Wigan Athletic on a recommendation by a teacher from his school league days to then Wigan manager Harry McNally. Lowe made his first-team début in October 1982 against Reading. At the end of the 1982–83 season, Wigan finished one point above the Third Division relegation zone. They then finished 15th in 1983–84 and 16th in 1984–85. At the end of the 1984–85 season, Lowe scored past Brentford in the Football League Trophy Final at Wembley with a spectacular overhead kick to help his team win the match 3–1. Bryan Hamilton then took charge at Springfield Park for the 1985–86 season, and led the club to within one place and one point of promotion. Ray Mathias then took the club to the newly created play-offs in 1986–87, where they were defeated by Swindon Town.

Ipswich Town
In June 1987, Lowe was transferred to Ipswich Town for £80,000. He hit 18 goals in 1987–88 to become the club's top scorer. Manager John Duncan took the "Blues" to within three points of the Second Division play-offs in 1988–89. He left the club after Ipswich finished five points outside the play-offs in 1989–90, with Lowe again finishing as the club's top scorer with 13 goals. New boss John Lyall then took over at Portman Road, and following a 14th-place finish in 1990–91, took the club to the Second Division title in 1991–92, four points ahead of Middlesbrough. Lowe missed the end-of-season run-in as he was loaned out to Port Vale in March 1992. He stayed at Vale Park for the rest of the season, and scored twice in nine games as the "Valiants" battled unsuccessfully to avoid exiting the Second Division at the opposite end to Ipswich.

Leicester City
In July 1992, Lowe signed for Leicester City, with manager Brian Little authorising a fee of £200,000. He had scored 42 goals in 169 appearances for the "Tractor boys" in all competitions. In a pre-season friendly against Borussia Mönchengladbach, one of his first games for the "Foxes", he broke his cheekbone. However, he would become a regular first team player at Filbert Street in 1992–93, bagging 12 goals to help the club book a place in the First Division play-offs. However, he did not find the net in 1993–94, and did not feature in the play-off Final victory over Derby County. In February 1994, Port Vale manager John Rudge managed to secure the out-of-favour Lowe on loan until the end of the season. This time he hit five goals in 19 appearances as he helped the "Valiants" to win promotion out of the Second Division in second place; this tally included a vital goal in a 2–1 win over eventual third-place club Plymouth Argyle. Back at Leicester, he found himself back in first team contention, though new boss Mark McGhee failed to keep the club in the Premier League following a poor start under Little. On 25 February 1995, Lowe scored against rivals Coventry City, in a 4–2 defeat at Highfield Road. The following month he also scored against Nottingham Forest, another of the club's major rivals, in another 4–2 defeat. He hit three goals in the 1995–96 campaign, but left the club before new boss Martin O'Neill could lead the club back to the top-flight via the play-offs.

Return to Wigan Athletic
In March 1996, he re-signed with Wigan Athletic, back in the Third Division (the old Fourth Division), who paid out a fee of £125,000. Under manager John Deehan, the "Latics" won the Third Division title in 1996–97, with Lowe scoring six goals in 40 games. His goal in the final game of the season secured the title, as they edged ahead of Fulham on goal difference. He then hit 16 league goals in 1997–98, to become both the club's top scorer and one of the highest scorers in the division. He was also voted the club's Player of the Season. In a surprise move, former boss Ray Mathias then returned to the club following a nine-year absence. Lowe hit three goals in 23 games in an injury-plagued 1998–99 campaign, as Wigan reached the play-offs, where they were defeated by Manchester City.

During his two spells at Wigan, Lowe scored 83 times in all competitions, making him the highest goal scorer in the club's Football League history. He also held the club record for most League goals (66) until this was surpassed by Andy Liddell in 2003.

Wrexham
Released by Wigan in June 1999, Lowe made the move to Second Division rivals Wrexham, where he was offered a player-coach role. He started just five games in 1999–2000, before joining Rushden & Diamonds on loan in January. He helped Diamonds to a second-place finish in the Football Conference, nine points behind champions Kidderminster Harriers.

Style of play
Lowe was an intelligent, ball-playing attacker.

Coaching career
After retiring as a player, Lowe worked for the Professional Footballers' Association until June 2002, when he joined Wigan Athletic under former teammate Paul Jewell. A fully qualified coach, Lowe fulfilled various roles at Wigan before following Jewell to Derby County and becoming Head of the Youth Academy at the club. Following the departure of Jewell and prior to the arrival of new manager Nigel Clough, Lowe was placed in temporary charge of solitary game in January 2009, where his Derby team beat Manchester United 1–0 in the first leg of the League Cup semi-final at Pride Park Stadium. He left the club in April 2009. He then did part-time work for Manchester United, in charge of the eldest participants in Manchester United Soccer Schools, before joining the back-room staff at Tranmere Rovers. In June 2011, Lowe joined Blackburn Rovers as head of youth coaching. In February 2017, Lowe was made assistant head coach to new club manager Tony Mowbray.

Career statistics
Source:

Honours
Individual
Wigan Athletic Player of the Year: 1997–98

Wigan Athletic
Football League Trophy: 1985
Football League Third Division: 1996–97

Ipswich Town
Football League Second Division: 1991–92

Port Vale
Football League Second Division second-place promotion: 1993–94

References

1965 births
Living people
English footballers
England under-21 international footballers
Association football wingers
Wigan Athletic F.C. players
Ipswich Town F.C. players
Port Vale F.C. players
Wrexham A.F.C. players
Rushden & Diamonds F.C. players
Leicester City F.C. players
English Football League players
Premier League players
English football managers
Derby County F.C. managers
English Football League managers
Association football coaches
Wigan Athletic F.C. non-playing staff
Manchester United F.C. non-playing staff
Tranmere Rovers F.C. non-playing staff
Blackburn Rovers F.C. non-playing staff